is a railway station on the Saikyō Line in Kita, Tokyo, Japan, operated by East Japan Railway Company (JR East).

Lines
Some trains continue northward to  via the Kawagoe Line and southward to  via the TWR Rinkai Line. The station is located 3.5 km north of Ikebukuro Station.

Station layout
The station consists of two side platforms serving two tracks.

Platforms

History
Jūjō Station opened on 1 November 1910.

Passenger statistics
In fiscal 2011, the station was used by an average of 34,044 passengers daily (boarding passengers only).

The passenger figures for previous years are as shown below.

Surrounding area

 Higashi-Jūjō Station (on the Keihin-Tohoku Line)
 Teikyo University Itabashi campus
 Tokyo Kasei University
 Tokyo Seitoku University
 Tokyo Seitoku College
 Teikyo University Hospital
 Teikyo Junior & Senior High School
 Tokyo Korean Junior & Senior High School
 Chuo Park
 JGSDF Camp Jujo

References

External links

 Jūjō Station information (JR East) 

Railway stations in Tokyo
Railway stations in Japan opened in 1910
Saikyō Line